An environmental chamber, also called a climatic chamber or climate chamber, is an enclosure used to test the effects of specified environmental conditions on biological items, industrial products, materials, and electronic devices and components.

Such a chamber can be used:
 as a stand-alone test for environmental effects on test specimens
 as preparation of test specimens for further physical tests or chemical tests
 as environmental conditions for conducting testing of specimens

Overview 

An environmental test chamber artificially replicates conditions which machinery, materials, devices or components might be exposed to. It is also used to accelerate the effects of exposure to the environment, sometimes at conditions not actually expected.

Chamber testing involves testing and exposing products to various environmental conditions in a controlled setting. Climatic Chamber testing and Thermal Shock testing are part of chamber testing. Climatic Chamber testing is a broad category of ways to simulate climate or excessive ambient conditions exposure for a product or a material under laboratory-controlled yet accelerated conditions. On the other hand, Thermal Shock testing is used to simulate how materials will react when exposed to changes in extreme climatic conditions, such as going from extremely cold to extremely hot conditions in a very short period of time (usually only few seconds).

These conditions may include:
 extreme temperatures
 sudden and extreme temperature variations - thermal shock
 altitude
 moisture or relative humidity
 electrodynamic vibrations
 electromagnetic radiation
 Cyclic corrosion testing
 salt spray
 rain
 weathering
 exposure to sun, causing UV degradation
 vacuum

Manufactured samples, specimens, or components are placed inside the chamber and subjected to one or more of these environmental parameters to determine reliability or measure after-effects such as corrosion.  In the case of machinery such as internal combustion engines, byproducts such as emissions are monitored.

An environmental chamber can be a small room used both to condition test specimens and to conduct the test.  It can be a smaller unit that's used for conditioning test items.  Also, some chambers are small enough to be placed onto a universal testing machine or other test apparatus.

Many chambers are set at a certain set of conditions.  Others can be programmed to cycle through specified sequences of conditions.

Design 

As test requirements may be relatively simple or complex, environmental test chambers vary widely in size, ranging from small units designed for placement on bench tops to large walk-in chambers.  Test chambers generally have viewports or video feeds to allow for visual inspection of the sample during the test.  Reach-in chambers provide an opening that technicians may use to handle test samples.  Chambers providing interior visual lighting must take into account the heat generated and compensate accordingly.

As with the wide variance in size, a number of user control options are available, ranging from simple analog indicators up to more modern digital readouts with LCD displays.  Chambers may be computer programmable, and networked or Web-enabled test chambers with built in web servers are also available.

Types of test chambers 
 Mechanically cooled test chambers
 Liquid nitrogen cooled test chambers
 Modular Walk-in Chambers

Test chamber standards 
Several standards organizations provide standards and guidance on environmental test chamber construction, temperature control standards, and engineering tolerances.
Institute of Environmental Sciences and Technology
 Air Conditioning, Heating and Refrigeration Institute (formerly the American Refrigerant Institute)
 American Society of Heating, Refrigerating, and Air-Conditioning Engineers Air conditioning#Heating
 ASTM International
 Underwriters Laboratories
 NSF International
 FM Global
 Canadian Standards Association
 International Organization for Standardization
 MIL-STD-810, "Test Method Standard for Environmental Engineering Considerations and Laboratory Tests", presently (2010) version G, issued in 2009
 IEC 60068, "Environmental Testing", with many parts.

See also 
 Cyclic corrosion testing
 Salt spray test
 Environmental stress cracking
 Doriot Climatic Chambers
 Accelerated aging
 Environmental stress screening
 Environmental stress fracture
 MIL-STD-810, DoD Standard for Environmental Engineering Considerations and Laboratory Tests
 Shelf life
 Standard conditions for temperature and pressure
 Thermo-mechanical fatigue test
 Universal testing machine
 Weather testing of polymers
 Stabilizers for polymers

References

Tests
Environmental testing